"Natural Blues" is a song by American electronic musician Moby. It was released on March 6, 2000, as the fifth single from his fifth studio album, Play (1999). The song is built around vocals sampled from "Trouble So Hard" by American folk singer Vera Hall (1937). "Natural Blues" was one of several songs on Play produced by Moby based on samples obtained from albums of American folk music originally compiled by field collector Alan Lomax.

The single was first released in the United Kingdom, where it peaked at number 11 on the UK Singles Chart. In Iceland it peaked at number one.

Background and composition
"Natural Blues" was produced by Moby for his fifth studio album Play, and contains samples from "Trouble So Hard" by American folk singer Vera Hall. Moby obtained the samples from a box set of folk music compiled by field collector Alan Lomax, and Hall and Lomax receive co-writing credits on the track. "Natural Blues", described by Moby as a "quite ethereal and mournful" song, is built around loops of Hall's vocals from the original recording. Moby had difficulties mixing the track and as a result he considered not including it on Play, but he eventually produced a satisfactory mix with assistance from the British duo 1 Giant Leap. English electronic music group I Monster are also credited with mixing duties.

Critical reception
The Daily Vaults Benjamin Ray described the song as "a better example of the blues lyrics-meets-electronic pastiche, with a quietly insistent beat that slowly builds up to a climax of keyboards and voices." Johnny Cigarettes from NME wrote that "on 'Natural Blues' the old-school blues crooner sounds like he always had a live rave PA element to his music. This is when Moby's much-vaunted eclecticism works brilliantly, sounding more godlike than Jesus Jones-like." Scott Marc Becker from Salon stated that it is "among the album's best tracks". He added that singer Vera Hall is "as potent in Moby's hands as she was a cappella, the ghost of her voice resonating as if she were still alive." Vickie Ilmer from Star Tribune called it "a hymnlike introspective discourse questioning hard times and retaining spirituality".

Music videos
Photographer and filmmaker David LaChapelle directed the accompanying promotional music video for "Natural Blues". LaChapelle had first indicated his interest in directing the video, and Moby, while a fan of his work, expressed hesitance at the idea due to the "bright and flashy" nature of his prior work, which he felt would not suit the song. However, LaChapelle reassured Moby that his vision for the video was "something quite subdued and earnest". The video depicts an elderly, wheelchair-using version of Moby in a retirement home watching video clips of himself as a young man. Fairuza Balk plays Moby's girlfriend in several of the clips. Eventually, an angelic figure, played by Christina Ricci, appears and carries him away.

As a child, LaChapelle made frequent visits to a retirement community where his mother worked as a nurse. He directly took the inspiration for the video's concept from a nightmare in which he found himself elderly, needing to use a wheelchair, and left in a hallway with many other senior citizens, unable to move. LaChapelle interpreted the song as sounding "like someone at the end of their life, reconciling with being at the end of their life" and felt that the retirement home concept suited the video. He added: "I was thinking that you can have this fabulous life, young and having fun, and in 60 years, who the hell knows where we could be? We could all be forgotten, warehoused somewhere." Extensive make-up was used on Moby to give him his elderly appearance in the video. The video later won the award for Best Video at the 2000 MTV Europe Music Awards, while also receiving a nomination for Best International Video at the 2000 MuchMusic Video Awards.

An alternate animated music video was also directed by Susi Wilkinson, Hotessa Laurence, and Filipe Alçada in the same style and featuring the same characters as in the music video for Moby's prior single "Why Does My Heart Feel So Bad?".

Track listings

 US CD single 
"Natural Blues"  – 3:03
"Natural Blues"  – 8:12
"Natural Blues"  – 4:12
"Natural Blues"  – 4:14
"Whispering Wind" – 6:08

 UK CD1 
"Natural Blues"  – 3:03
"The Whispering Wind" – 6:08
"Sick in the System" – 4:17

 UK CD2 
"Natural Blues"  – 8:12
"Natural Blues"  – 4:14
"Natural Blues"  – 6:29

 UK 12-inch single 1 
"Natural Blues" – 4:17
"Natural Blues"  – 6:22
"Natural Blues"  – 7:51

 UK 12-inch single 2 
"Natural Blues"  – 7:45
"Natural Blues"  – 8:14

Charts

Original version

Weekly charts

Year-end charts

Lulu Rouge vs. Stella Polaris remix

Showtek remix

Certifications

Release history

Covers
A cover of "Natural Blues" performed live at First Avenue by American musician Mark Mallman was released on his 2003 album Live from First Avenue, Minneapolis.

References

External links

1999 songs
2000 singles
Moby songs
Music videos directed by David LaChapelle
Mute Records singles
Number-one singles in Iceland
Songs written by Moby
V2 Records singles